Orthosia segregata is a species of cutworm or dart moth in the family Noctuidae.

The MONA or Hodges number for Orthosia segregata is 10493.

References

Further reading

 
 
 

Orthosia
Articles created by Qbugbot
Moths described in 1893